Pauline Vasseur (born 5 January 1988), who performs under the mononym Pauline, is a French composer, songwriter and singer.

Biography
Pauline Vasseur was born 5 January 1988 in Lens, Pas-de-Calais. She began to play the piano at five. When she was 12 years old, she joined the Conservatory of Lille, where the passion of her piano teacher, David Masson, seemed to rub off on her. She then prepared to pass the Diplôme d'études musicales that she obtained at 15. She worked and wrote some texts with Martin Rappeneau, Lena Ka, Jean-Luc Léonardon and François Welgryn. Allô le monde, her first album, was released on 1 October 2007. During the concert on the Champ de Mars on 14 July Pauline, then 19 years, sang her hit "Allô le monde" in front of more than 500,000 people.

Discography

Albums

Singles

References

External links
 
 

1988 births
Living people
French singer-songwriters
People from Lens, Pas-de-Calais
Pauline